Wukun Wanambi (1962 – 4 May 2022) was an Australian Yolngu painter, filmmaker and curator of the Marrakulu clan of northeastern Arnhem Land.

Biography 
Wanambi was born in Gurka'wuy as the oldest son in his family. His father, Mithili Wanambi, was an esteemed clan leader and renowned painter. Although he was born to a family of artists, he wished to be a politician growing up.

When Mithili died in 1981, sacred clan designs could no longer be painted because no one had the authority to paint them anymore. It was not until 1997 that Djunggayi (caretakers and preservers of clan knowledge) taught Wanambi the designs. Wanambi then began painting and created for the Saltwater Country exhibition, re-introducing motifs that had not been painted since his father's death. From this point on, he became a highly renowned artist, dedicated to honouring his father and ancestry through his art.

He died in Darwin on 4 May 2022.

Artwork 
While Wanambi was an artist who used many different media, he is best known as a painter and sculptor who works with natural pigments on bark and traditional memorial poles, or larrakitj. He also made prints at the Bulka-Larrrŋgay Mulka Centre. He was the Cultural Director of the Mulka Project, the media centre in Buku-Larrŋgay Mulka. Through this position, he advised individuals on what they have the clan authority to depict in film. However, he was also a video artist himself, working to bridge generations by creating archival art that reconstructed ceremonial documentary archives. Rather than solidifying binaries of past and present, traditional and modern, Wanambi aimed to show the interconnectedness of time as well as the global network through the recording of ceremonial practices.

Using both his artwork and his involvement with the Mulka Project, Wanambi advocated for the agency and involvement of Aboriginal peoples to cultivate a true understanding of Aboriginal cultures.

Curatorial practice 
In 2017, Wanambi traveled to the United States to join the curatorial team for the exhibition Madayin: Eight Decades of Aboriginal Australian Art from Yirrkala. This was Wanambi's first time working as a curator. In 2018 he served as curatorial consultant on the exhibition MIwatj at the La Trobe Art Institute. Wanambi believed in incorporating Aboriginal peoples at all levels of art exhibition, and his curatorial work with the Maḏayin exhibition project reflected his desire for Yolngu culture to be depicted the Yolngu way.

Awards 
1998 – NATSIAA Awards – Best Bark

2003 – National Aboriginal and Torres Strait Islander Art Awards – Highly Commended (3D Work)

2007 – Togart Contemporary Art Award (NT) - Winner of Peoples Choice

2010 – National Aboriginal and Torres Strait Islander Art Awards – Wandjuk Marika 3D Memorial Award Telstra

2018 – National Aboriginal and Torres Strait Islander Art Awards – Wandjuk Marika 3D Memorial Award Telstra

Collections 
 MAGNT 
 ANMM 
 Sydney Opera House, Sydney, NSW 
 Harland Collection 
 Kerry Stokes Collection 
 NT Supreme Court-Wukidi 
 South Australian Art Gallery 
 National Gallery of Australia 
 Art Gallery of NSW 
 Holmes a Court Collection 
 Artbank 
 Manly Regional Gallery 
 Musee de Lyon France 
 Colin and Liz Laverty, Sydney 
 Museum of Contemporary Art, Sydney, NSW 
 British Museum, UK
Kluge-Ruhe Aboriginal Art Collection of the University of Virginia

Significant exhibitions 
 1998 NATSIAA
 1998–2001 Saltwater
 2001 18th NATSIAA, MAGNT 
 2001 New from Old Annandale Galleries, Sydney, NSW. 
 2002 19th NATSIAA, Museum and Art Galleries of the NT, Darwin 
 2003 Brighton International Art Festival UK 
 2003 Larrakitj Rebecca Hossack Gallery 
 2003 20th NATSIAA MAGNT
 2004 Wukun Wanambi (first solo show) Raft 2 Darwin 
 2005 Wukun Wanambi Niagara Galleries Melbourne 
 2005 Yakumirri, Raft Artspace (exhibition purchased by the Holmes a Court collection) 
 2005 22nd NATSIAA MAGNT
 2005 'Yåkumirri', Holmes a Court Gallery, Perth Artbank: Celebrating 25 Years of Australian Art touring exhibition 4.06-10.07 9 regional galleries from Cairns to Bathurst 
 2006 TOGA NT Contemporary Art Award Parliament House Darwin 
 2006 Telstra NATSIAA
 2006 ‘Walking together to aid Aboriginal Health.’ Shalom College UNSW 
 2006 ‘Bulayi- Small Gems’ Suzanne O'Connell Gallery Brisbane 2006 'Arnhem Land Ochres' Mina Mina Art Gallery Brunswick Heads. 
 2007 Toga NT Contemporary Art Award – winner Peoples Choice 
 2007 Galuku Gallery, Festival of Darwin, NT 
 2007 Bukulungthunmi - Coming Together, One Place, Raft Artspace, Darwin, NT 
 2008 Outside Inside - bark and hollow logs from Yirrkala, Bett Gallery Hobart, Tas 
 2008 Yarpany - Honey - bark paintings and Hollow Logs of the Marrakulu Clan, Framed Gallery, Darwin, NT 
 2008 Gapan Gallery - Bendt Prints, Garma Festival Site, Gulkula, NT. 
 2008 Galuku Gallery (Nomad Art Productions) - Berndt Prints, Darwin Festival, Botanical Gardens, Darwin, NT 
 2008, Wukun Wanambi - Niagara Galleries, Richmond, Vic 
 2009 Larrakitj - Kerry Stokes Collection, Western Australian Art Gallery, Perth, WA 
 2009 After Berndt - Etchings from the Drawings, Indigenart Subiaco, WA 
 2009–2010 Almanac: Australian Art from the Gift of Ann Lewis AO, Museum of Contemporary Art, Sydney, NSW 
 2010 The White Show, Short Street Gallery, Broome, WA 
 2010 17th Biennale of Sydney, ‘Larrakitj ‘- the Kerry Stokes Collection, Museum on Contemporary Art, Sydney, NSW 
 2010 ‘Returning to Djakapurra' - A Collection of Poles and Barks from Yirrkala, Redot Gallery, Singapore. 2010, 27th NATSIAA, Museum and Art Gallery of the Northern Territory, Darwin, NT - Winner 3D category
 2011 One Clan Three Hands, Niagara Galleries, Melbourne Vic 2011 Telstra NATSIAA, MAGNT Darwin NT 
 2011 Gapan Gallery GARMA Festival, Northeast Arnhem Land, NT
 2012 Three, Chan Contemporary Art Space, Darwin NT 2013 Finalist West Australian Indigenous art Awards
 2013 Prized Nomad Art Darwin 
 2013 'Found' Annandale Galleries Sydney NSW 2013 Gapan Gallery GARMA Festival, Northeast Arnhem Land, NT 
 2014 Gapan Gallery GARMA Festival, Northeast Arnhem Land, NT 
 2015 NATSIAA, MAGNT 2015 Enduring Civilisations, British Museum, UK 
 2015 Gapan Gallery GARMA Festival, Northeast Arnhem Land, NT 
 2015 Revolution, Nomad Art, Darwin NT 
 2015 Yirrkala Mob, Bangarra Boards. RAFT Art Space, Alice Springs NT 
 2015 Unsettled, National Museum of Australia, ACT
 2019–2020 The Inside World: Contemporary Aboriginal Australian Memorial Poles, Nevada Museum of Art and touring.

References

Further reading 
 "Extended lives in global spaces:the anthropology of Yolngu pre-burial ceremonies". login.proxy01.its.virginia.edu. doi:10.1111/1467-9655.12403. Retrieved 2021-03-19.
"(PDF) Material Expressions of Ancestral Agency - Yolngu acting in virtual space". ResearchGate. Retrieved 2021-03-18.

1962 births
2022 deaths
Yolngu people
Indigenous Australian artists
People from the Northern Territory